O'Karo Akamune (born February 25, 1992) is an American-born Nigerian basketball player for Hørsholm 79ers and the Nigerian national team.

He participated at the AfroBasket 2017.

References

External links
Western Kentucky Hilltoppers bio

1992 births
Living people
American men's basketball players
Basketball players from Atlanta
Hørsholm 79ers players
Junior college men's basketball players in the United States
Nigerian men's basketball players
Power forwards (basketball)
Western Kentucky Hilltoppers basketball players